This is a list of notable residents of Huntington Beach, California.

Notable people

Actors
 Willie Aames, attended Edison High School
 Eva Angelina, adult film actress
 Ethan Embry, actor
 Lauren German, actress of NBC TV series Chicago Fire
 Amy Grabow, grew up in Huntington Beach; attended the Academy for the Performing Arts
 Jenna Jameson, pornographic actress; resided in Huntington Harbour with Tito Ortiz
 Jack Kelly, most noted for the role of Bart Maverick on the Maverick TV series; during the 1980s and early 1990s, served as city councilman and mayor in Huntington Beach
 Jason Lee, actor, who portrays the title character in TV series My Name is Earl; grew up in Huntington Beach and attended Ocean View High School
 Dennis Woodruff,  Los Angeles based actor, producer, and director

Athletes

 Pro skateboarders Christian Hosoi, Geoff Rowley, Arto Saari, Tosh Townend, Mark Appleyard, Brian Sumner, Ed Templeton, and Nyjah Huston.
 Former NHL hockey player John Blue 
 Professional soccer player Sacha Kljestan
 Mixed martial artists: Tito "The Huntington Beach Bad Boy" Ortiz, Kimo Leopoldo, Tank Abbott and James Irvin
 Collin Balester, baseball player, attended Huntington Beach High School
 Hank Conger, baseball player, attended Huntington Beach High School
 Jessie Godderz, professional bodybuilder with the World Natural Body Building Federation, contestant on Big Brother 10 and Big Brother 11, and professional wrestler signed to Impact Wrestling
 Julio César González, boxer, 1996 Olympic athlete representing Mexico, WBO light-heavyweight champion 2003, attended Edison High
 Bill Green, former United States Record and NCAA Record holder in track and field, 5th in hammer throw at 1984 Summer Olympic Games
 Tony Gonzalez, Pro Football Hall of Fame tight end attended Huntington Beach High School
 Kyle Higashioka, Major League Baseball catcher
 Ian Kennedy, San Diego Padres pitcher, was born in Huntington Beach
 Jeff Kent, retired baseball player and recipient of baseball's 2000 National League MVP award, was raised in Huntington Beach and attended Edison High School.
 Jürgen Klinsmann, soccer player, coach of the Germany national football team and former coach of the United States men's national soccer team; moved with his family in 2008 to Munich, Germany to become the coach of FC Bayern Munich. Klinsmann currently resides in Newport Beach.
 Chris Kluwe, football punter
 Iris Kyle, 10-time overall Ms. Olympia professional bodybuilder
 Scott Lipsky, professional tennis player
 Abner Mares, boxer
 David Martin, professional tennis player
 Paul McBeth, professional disc golfer and five-time PDGA world champion
 Peter Mel, surfer
 Henry Owens, baseball player
 Nick Pratto, baseball player, first-round selection in 2017 MLB Draft
Joe Seanoa (ring name Samoa Joe), professional wrestler signed to WWE
 Tom Shields, swimmer, 2009 graduate of Edison High School, gold medalist in 400 medley relay for U.S. at 2015 World Swimming Championships in Kazan, Russia
 Brett Simpson, surfer
 Zane Smith, NASCAR Camping World Truck Series driver
 Peter "PT" Townend, surfer
 Joan Weston, star of Roller Derby
 Bob Wolcott, former Seattle Mariners pitcher, was born in Huntington Beach

Musicians
 Members of the rock/metal band Avenged Sevenfold grew up and reside here including lead guitarist Synyster Gates . Original drummer and founding member, The Rev, was buried here.
Dexter Holland from The Offspring lived in Huntington Beach.
 Kevin "Noodles" Wasserman from The Offspring lives in Huntington Beach
 The ska punk rock band Reel Big Fish formed here in 1992.
 Dean Torrence, from the 1960s pop group Jan and Dean, who co-wrote "Surf City" (#1 in 1963), said that Huntington Beach embodies the song's spirit of freedom and California fun.
 Christian Jacobs, MC Bat Commander of The Aquabats
 Matt Costa, folk pop singer, was born in Huntington Beach.
 (Hed) P.E., punk rock/hip hop group, was formed in Huntington Beach.
 The Vandals, punk rock band formed in Huntington Beach
 Alien Ant Farm lead singer Dryden Mitchell
 David Silveria, formerly from the rock band Korn
 Doug Webb, saxophonist.
 Scott Weiland, of the Stone Temple Pilots and formerly of Velvet Revolver, attended Edison High School.
 Paul Williams, composer, singer, songwriter and actor.
 Brett Young, country singer who was raised in Huntington Beach.
 Joe and Luke McGarry of the indie band Pop Noir were born in Manchester, England, but grew up in Huntington Beach.
The reggae band, The Dirty Heads was formed in Huntington Beach.
hellogoodbye was formed in Huntington Beach in 2001.
The Suburban Legends are natives of Huntington Beach.
 The alternative/pop band Emblem3 moved to Huntington Beach to pursue their musical career.
Beau Bokan, American singer for metal band blessthefall was born in Huntington Beach.
Buckethead, American guitarist and multi-instrumentalist was born in Huntington Beach.
 Yung Pinch, a rapper known for his beach boy image, grew up in Huntington Beach.
Kristopher Kirk, self proclaimed King of Punk and musician is from Huntington Beach.
The Ziggens, surf rock band formed in Huntington Beach

Other
 Pete Conrad, astronaut
 Violet Cowden, aviator and member of the Women Airforce Service Pilots during World War II
 Lani Forbes, young adult writer
 Donald Lu, diplomat
Brent Rivera, social media personality 
 Kenneth True Norris Jr., industrialist and philanthropist
 Jasmine Tookes, model for Victoria's Secret

References

Huntington Beach, California
 
Huntington Beach